The Banyan is a non-governmental organization based in Chennai, India was founded in 1993 by Vandana Gopikumar and Vaishnavi Jayakumar to cater to the mentally ill and homeless women in the city.

This includes emergency care and critical time interventions offered across 2 hospital based settings, and one shelter for homeless persons with psychosocial disabilities, operated in collaboration with the Corporation of Chennai, reaching out to 162 individuals in distress at any given point of time. Over 3400 individuals have accessed these services since 1993.

The Banyan's NALAM programme offers well-being oriented outpatient clinics and community based mental health care in both urban and rural areas. These clinics provide free of charge and mental health and social care services, address distress, common mental disorders and severe mental disorders. They are offered across 15 service access points, reaching out to a population of approximately 7 lakhs. NALAM has reached out to over 10,000 individuals and has a current active registry of 2000 individuals.

For those who experience high support needs, The Banyan offers a range of inclusive living options, over 200 individuals with moderate to severe mental health issues, today live in communities & homelike environments with supportive services across 6 districts in 3 States (Tamil Nadu, Kerala, Maharashtra).

The Banyan's sister organisation was founded in 2007. BALM uses capacity building, education programmes (diploma, masters’, and PhD programmes) in collaboration with the Tata Institute of Social Sciences (TISS), research, collaborative work (with civil society organisations, local governments, disability movements, mental health user-caregiver groups, and Central and State Government) and construction of think tanks, as strategies to influence progressive policies and plans.

Chapters

Trichy Chapter 
The Banyan's chapter in Trichy have built a programme that provides long-term care for 32 women through the Home Again approach.

Kerala Chapter 
The Banyan's Kerala Chapter is led by Mr. Salih PM, a social worker and social entrepreneur who has been with The Banyan for over 10 years. He leads a team of 10 mental health professionals that run our Kerala Chapter, currently housing 22 residents through the Home Again programme.

In Kerala, The Banyan is also working in collaboration with Tata Institute of Social Sciences, The Hans Foundation and The Government of Kerala on reorienting the social architecture of institutional mental health care. The project, known as "Snehakoodu" aims to identify long-stay patients in the government mental health centres in Trissur, Trivandrum and Calicut and facilitate their return to their homes or into inclusive living long-term care options, such as the Home Again program.

Maharashtra Chapter 

The Banyan chapter in Maharashtra is a collaboration with Tata Institute of Social Sciences Field Action Programme and the Integrated Rural Health and Development Project, Tata Trusts and the Government of Maharashtra. The project entails the facilitation of exit pathways out of institutionalised care for persons who have been incarcerated within mental health facilities for extended periods of time.

Services

Emergency Care and Recovery Services 
The Banyan rescues homeless individuals with mental illness through referrals and calls. They have 2 hospital based settings that service women and one shelter for homeless men with psychosocial needs run in collaboration with the corporation of Chennai. Combined, these locations serve around 150 individuals at a time.

The Government of Tamil Nadu - National Health Mission plans to set up multiple new emergency care and recovery centres for individuals with mental illness, both those who are homeless and those who are not. The Banyan will act as capacity building partners on this project, and will also share the protocols and values of their emergency care and recovery services, so that they will be replicated in these new centres.

Reintegration & Aftercare 
The Banyan works with police and local organisations to help their clients reconnect with their families after they have gotten better. They conduct home visits and educate family members on illness management prior to reintegrating the client.

The aftercare programme ensures continuity of care after an individual has returned home.  It functions through a coalition of civil society organisations, Government agencies, and individual functionaries (community health workers/peer advocates and activists) with capabilities to offer integrated mental health and social care interventions. Besides access to medical and psychological/counselling support, social care facilitation such as problem solving, work placement, access to social entitlements and local community support circles are also essential components of our aftercare programme.

NALAM: Wellbeing oriented outpatient care 
The Banyan's NALAM programme is a well-being oriented, community based mental health care programme driven by grassroots workers who offer multi-tiered, multi-interventional packages of mental health care, that range from tracking progress on symptom reduction and securing economic stability, to pursuing personal aspirations. This programme exists across both rural and urban sites, servicing a population of over 1 million across 3 States (Tamil Nadu, Kerala and Maharashtra) and 6 districts through 17 mental health service access points. To date - 10,000 clients have accessed these services,  and over 800 children access the youth clubs, pre-adolescent workshops, and tuition centres offered through this same programme.

NALAM Urban 
NALAM Urban serves predominantly low-income areas in the Greater Chennai City Area   and has cultivated a grassroots presence across all of the wards (Mogappair, Padi, Padiputhunagar, KK Nagar, Jafarkhanpet, West Saidapet, Choolaimedu, Santhome and Teynampet) it works in.

The urban clinics are located in Chennai across these locations:

 Loyola College (Nungambakkam)
 The State Training and Resource Center (KK Nagar)
 Stella Maris College (Cathedral Road)
 Shelter for Homeless Men (Santhome)
 Emergency Care and Recovery Center (Mogappair West)

NALAM Rural 
NALAM Rural offers inpatient and outpatient programmes that address clinical and social care needs of individuals in need. The NALAM community mobilisers also engage in innovative mental health awareness programmes across local NGOs, youth groups, PHCs and MGNREGs sites.

Outreach clinics are co-located with Government  run spaces, such as the Government Primary Health Centre, and the Panchayat office. This is in an attempt to work alongside the Government machinery, and support the implementation of the Government District Mental Health Programme (DMHP).

The rural clinics are located in Kanchipuram districts across these locations:

Kovalam
Sembakkam
Manampathy

This approach will soon be replicated in collaboration with The Government of Tamil Nadu as a means to strengthen the District Mental Health Programme (DMHP)

Inclusive Living Options 
For individuals who require long-term care, The Banyan offers supportive care inclusive living long term options. These programmes encourage social inclusion and currently almost 300 individuals are residing in these projects.

Clustered Group Homes 

The Banyan's Clustered Group Home is a pseudo-institutional long-term care home. In it, about 50 women reside across 8 cottages, where women live, work and support one another while contributing to their home and space. In this setting support is provided to address complex long-term physical, psychological and economic needs of the clients. The women who live here spend their days pursuing work and vocational training as well as recreation and leisure activities of their choice.  The Clustered Group Home is co-located with the BALM-TISS, a college that offers capacity building masters’, PhD and diploma programs in mental health.

Home Again 

Home Again is a model of care, for individuals with mental illness who require long-term care that fosters choice based, inclusive living spaces through clustered or scattered homes in rural or urban neighbourhoods with a range of supportive services for people. Through this programme's model, individuals form affinity groups and live together in homes in a community. Together they create a shared space of comfort that mimics a familial environment. Every house of three to five women is staffed by a community worker who facilitates the psychosocial and medical intervention they continue to need and the women are encouraged to engage in a diverse range of work, and embrace leisure, recreation and socialization with the community. This programme is currently active in Tamil Nadu (Chennai, Kovalam & Trichy), Kerala (Mallapuram), and has been implemented in Assam through a partner organisation, Ashadeep.

The Banyan is currently part of a collaborative project (along with Tata Institute of Social Sciences, The Hans Foundation and The Government of Kerala) in Kerala to facilitate exit options for long-stay patients in government run mental health centres. Many of the long-stay patients who will be identified through this project will be transferred to Home Again homes within Kerala.

Skills Development 
At The Banyan, vocational training and work placement is offered across three verticals - arts & crafts (wire and jute products, carpentry, tailoring etc.), hospitality services (housekeeping, beauty services, laundry, waitstaff etc.), and healthcare (personal assistants, community based mental health workers, peer advocates, programme managers etc.)

The organisation holds income enhancement and vocational independence as significant factors of importance when it comes to personal recovery. In addition to internal work placements and vocational training, The Banyan also has ties with external organisations to facilitate employment outside of the organisation. They also offer clients small and medium scale grants to federate social cooperatives. 60% of their clients are gainfully employed and productive in work.

Partnerships

Institutional Donors 
The Banyan works with several longstanding partners who have enabled development of mental health solutions for those living with severe mental disorders, intensification of our engagement in mental health programs in low resource settings and in scaling up inclusive living options for those living with severe disability and persistent mental health issues. These include Tata Trusts, Azim Premji Philanthropic Initiatives, The Breadsticks Foundation, RF(I)T, Grand Challenges Canada, Paul Hamlyn Foundation, The Hans Foundation, HCL Foundation, BMW-Karl Monz and Oracle.

Government Partners 
The Banyan is engaged with three State Governments (Tamil Nadu, Kerala and Maharashtra) towards revitalizing the paradigm of institutional mental health care. This program  will includes scale up of three critical approaches developed by The Banyan - Home Again, Emergency Care and Recovery Services, and the NALAM approach. It will also implement feasible reintegration and aftercare options.

Govt of Tamil Nadu: The Banyan in liaison with the Government of Tamil Nadu under the National Health Mission, has operationalised Emergency Care and Recovery Centres (ECRCs) across two districts (Vellore and Tirupur). These two centers have been functioning based on a value board drawn from The Banyan’s principles allowing for responsive, user-centric, and inclusive systems of mental health and sync in the vision of the state and national policies on mental health and disability. This apart we also plans for identifying and onboarding partners and experts for streamlining action.

Govt of Kerala: Post the initial screening in three government mental hospitals in Kerala (Kozhikode, Thrissur and Trivandrum), the team has been working with an aftercare and reintegration focus. An Emergency Care and Recovery Center in coalition with the Government and the Devaswom has been operationalised in Guruvayur.

Govt  of Maharashtra: The Banyan is working with the Government of Maharashtra to transition 30 clients with long term needs from Ratnagiri and Thane Regional Mental Hospitals (RMHs) to commutable living settings in the form of Home Again. The Banyan is additionally engaged in a partnership with the Tata Institute of Social Sciences field action project, Integrated Rural and Human Development Project, in implementing a community mental health clinic for the Adivasi population in Aghai Panchayat and surrounding padas.

Awards*-+   
The Banyan and its founders have acquired several accolades since 1993, including the Stree Shakthi Puraskar Award (Ministry of Women and Child Development) in 2003 G.D. Birla International Award in 2005, The Sat Paul Mittal National Award, 2007, AmeriCares Spirit of Humanity Awards, 2011, Swiss Foundation award with WHO in 2012  Sitaram Jindal Award, 2012, WHO Public Health Champion Award (India), 2017, and the University of Pennsylvania Nursing Renfield Foundation Award for Global Women's Health in 2018.

References

Mental health organisations in India
1993 establishments in Tamil Nadu
Organizations established in 1993
Poverty in India
Homelessness